Juhan Peegel (|19 May 1919 Reina, Saare County, Estonia – 6 November 2007) was Estonian journalist, linguist and writer.

From 1941–1945, he served as a soldier in the Estonian Rifle Regiment.

In 1951, he graduated from Tartu University.

From 1947–1952, he worked at the editorial office of the newspaper Edasi.

He began lecturing at Tartu University in 1952.

In 1977, he became a member of Estonian Academy of Sciences.

Awards
1996 Wiedemann language award
1993 and 1998 Republic of Estonia science prize
1999 Republic of Estonia science life work prize

References

1919 births
2007 deaths
Estonian journalists
Estonian male writers
20th-century Estonian writers
Estonian non-fiction writers
20th-century Estonian novelists
Linguists from Estonia
University of Tartu alumni
People from Saaremaa Parish
20th-century linguists
20th-century journalists
Male non-fiction writers
Soviet journalists
Linguists from the Soviet Union